Necessity and duress (compulsion) are different defenses in a criminal case. The defense of duress applies when another person threatens imminent harm if defendant did not act to commit the crime. The defense of necessity applies when defendant is forced by natural circumstances to choose between two evils, and the criminal act is the lesser evil.

References

Criminal defenses